Blacken the Angel is the debut studio album by the German symphonic black metal band Agathodaimon. It was released 4 August 1998 through Nuclear Blast records.
In 2009 Metal Mind Productions reissued the album as a remastered digipak edition. The reissue is limited to numerated 2000 copies and was digitally remastered using 24-Bit process on golden disc.

Track listing 

 Tracks 1, 2 and 7 are in Romanian, and track 5 is in German.

Personnel
 Sathonys - guitars
 Hyperion - guitars
 Akaias - vocals
 Vlad Dracul - keyboards
 Matthias R. - drums
 Marko T. - bass

Additional personnel and staff
 Ophelia - female vocals
 Vampallens - keyboards
 Gerald Axelrod - photography
 Sander N. - cover art
 Markus Staiger - executive producer
 Gerhard Magin - producer
 Barbara Stiller - band photography

References 

Agathodaimon (band) albums
Nuclear Blast albums
1998 debut albums